The 1951–52 British Ice Hockey season featured the English National League and Scottish National League.

English National League

English Autumn Cup

Results

Scottish National League

Regular season

Playoffs
Semifinals
Falkirk Lions - Dundee Tigers 9:7 on aggregate (6:1, 3:6)
Ayr Raiders - Perth Panthers 7:10 on aggregate (4:1, 3:9)
Final
Falkirk Lions - Perth Panthers 8:6 on aggregate (6:4, 2:2)

Scottish Autumn Cup

Results

Scottish Cup

Results
First round
Ayr Raiders - Perth Panthers 11:3
Dundee Tigers - Fife Flyers 2:1
Dunfermline Vikings - Paisley Pirates 9:4
Semifinals
Falkirk Lions - Ayr Raiders (4:5, 2+ goal win for Falkirk)
Dunfermline Vikings - Dundee Tigers 12:6 on aggregate (3:4, 9:2)
Final
Falkirk Lions - Dunfermline Vikings 9:5 on aggregate (5:3, 4:2)

Canada Cup

Results

References 

British
1951 in English sport
1952 in English sport
1951–52 in British ice hockey
1951 in Scottish sport
1952 in Scottish sport